The  is the prefectural parliament of Hiroshima Prefecture.

Members
As of 4 October 2019:

References

External links
Official website (Japanese)

Prefectural assemblies of Japan
Politics of Hiroshima Prefecture